Bagrat V (1620–1681), of the Bagrationi Dynasty, was a king of Imereti, whose troubled reign in the years of 1660–61, 1663–68, 1669–78, and 1679–81, was marked by extreme instability and feudal anarchy in the kingdom.

Reign 
The eldest son of Alexander III of Imereti by his first wife, Bagrat V succeeded on his father's death in 1660. His influential stepmother Darejan made him marry her niece, Ketevan. However, a year later, Darejan disrupted the union and offered Bagrat herself as a bride. On the king's refusal, Darejan had him arrested and blinded. The queen dowager then remarried an insignificant aristocrat, Vakhtang Tchutchunashvili, and had him crowned as king. The move drew many nobles into opposition. They enlisted the Ottoman and Mingrelian support and restored Bagrat. Darejan was exiled to Akhaltsikhe, in the Ottoman-held Georgian province.

In 1668, Bagrat was once again dethroned by Darejan's party with the military support of the pasha of Akhaltsikhe. However, both Darejan and her favorite were soon murdered, and Bagrat reclaimed the crown in 1669. These events had been closely watched by the royal court in Tbilisi, eastern Georgia. King Vakhtang V Shahnawaz of Kartli, whose cooperation with the Persian suzerains allowed him to bring the whole eastern Georgia under his control, campaigned in Imereti and crowned his son Archil as king of Imereti in 1678. Under pressure from the Ottomans, however, Archil was soon recalled from Kutaisi, and Bagrat was replaced on the throne again in 1679.

Family 
Bagrat was married three times. His first wife was Ketevan, daughter of Prince David of Kakheti, whom he divorced in 1661. He married secondly Tatia, daughter of Constantine I, Prince of Mukhrani, and repudiated the union in 1663 to marry her sister, Tamar (died 1683). He had two sons and three daughters:
 Alexander IV (died 1695), born of a concubine, was King of Imereti from 1691 to 1695.
 Prince Giorgi (1676–1678), born of Bagrat's marriage to Tamar of Mukhrani.
 Princess Darejan (died after 1726), who was married successively to Prince Giorgi III Gurieli (died 1684), Prince Paata Abashidze (died 1684), and Papuna II, Duke of Racha (died 1696).  
 Princess Mariam (died c. 1726), who was married successively to Prince Iese Chikovani (died c. 1703) and Shoshita III, Duke of Racha (died 1729).  
 Princess Tinatin (1678–1760), who was married to Prince Giorgi Gurieli and then Prince Levan IV Dadiani (died 1691). She became a nun under the name of Nino in 1704 and followed the suite of Vakhtang VI of Kartli in the Russian Empire in 1724.

References

 Вахушти Багратиони (Vakhushti Bagrationi) (1745). История Царства Грузинского: Жизнь Имерети.
David Marshall Lang, The Last Years of the Georgian Monarchy, 1658-1832. New York: Columbia University Press, 1957.

1620 births
1681 deaths
Bagrationi dynasty of the Kingdom of Imereti
Kings of Imereti
17th-century people from Georgia (country)
Eastern Orthodox monarchs
Blind royalty and nobility